iTunes Session is the eighth overall and first live EP by American rock band Imagine Dragons released on May 28, 2013 through KIDinaKORNER and Interscope.

Track listing

Charts

Release history

References

2013 EPs
Imagine Dragons EPs
Albums produced by Alex da Kid
ITunes Session
Interscope Records EPs
Kidinakorner albums